Daniel Jorge Castellani (born 21 March 1961) is an Argentine professional volleyball coach and former player. He was a member of the Argentina national team from 1976 to 1988, and a bronze medallist at the Olympic Games Seoul 1988 and the 1982 World Championship. He currently serves as head coach for the Argentina women's national team.

Personal life
Castellani was born in Buenos Aires, Argentina. He is married to Silvina Pozzo. They have two children – daughter named Ariana and son Iván, who was also a volleyball player, playing as an opposite spiker in the Argentine national team.

Career

As a coach
He was a head coach of Skra Bełchatów in 2006–2009. In 2009, he took charge of the Polish national team, and in September 2009 led the team to the European Champions title. On 14 September 2009, he was awarded the Knight's Cross of Polonia Restituta. The Order was conferred on the following day by the Prime Minister of Poland, Donald Tusk. He was dismissed before the end of his contract after an unsatisfactory result at the 2010 World Championship held in Italy. 

In 2012, he was appointed new head coach of the PlusLiga team, ZAKSA Kędzierzyn-Koźle. 

In May 2015, he started his work in Sir Safety Perugia. 

In May 2017, after one season spent in Noliko Maaseik, he moved to Funvic Taubaté. Castellani was dismissed from his post in 2019, and replaced by Renan Dal Zotto.

Honours

As a player
 CEV Cup
  1987/1988 – with Camst Bologna
 CEV Challenge Cup
  1985/1986 – with Kutiba Falconara
  1988/1989 – with Petrarca Padova
 Youth national team
 1980  CSV U21 South American Championship

As a coach
 CEV Challenge Cup
  2013/2014 – with Fenerbahçe

 National championships
 2002/2003  Argentine Championship, with Orígenes Bolívar
 2003/2004  Argentine Championship, with Orígenes Bolívar
 2006/2007  Polish Cup, with PGE Skra Bełchatów
 2006/2007  Polish Championship, with PGE Skra Bełchatów
 2007/2008  Polish Cup, with PGE Skra Bełchatów
 2007/2008  Polish Championship, with PGE Skra Bełchatów
 2008/2009  Polish Cup, with PGE Skra Bełchatów
 2008/2009  Polish Championship, with PGE Skra Bełchatów
 2011/2012  Turkish SuperCup, with Fenerbahçe
 2011/2012  Turkish Cup, with Fenerbahçe
 2011/2012  Turkish Championship, with Fenerbahçe
 2012/2013  Polish Cup, with ZAKSA Kędzierzyn-Koźle
 2016/2017  Belgian SuperCup, with Noliko Maaseik

State awards
 2009:  Officer's Cross of Polonia Restituta

References

External links

 
 
 
 Coach profile at LegaVolley.it 
 Player profile at LegaVolley.it 
 Coach/Player profile at Volleybox.net

1961 births
Living people
Volleyball players from Buenos Aires
Argentine men's volleyball players
Argentine volleyball coaches
Volleyball coaches of international teams
Olympic volleyball players of Argentina
Volleyball players at the 1984 Summer Olympics
Volleyball players at the 1988 Summer Olympics
Medalists at the 1988 Summer Olympics
Olympic medalists in volleyball
Olympic bronze medalists for Argentina
Argentine expatriate sportspeople in Brazil
Expatriate volleyball players in Brazil
Argentine expatriate sportspeople in Italy
Expatriate volleyball players in Italy
Argentine expatriate sportspeople in Poland
Argentine expatriate sportspeople in Finland
Argentine expatriate sportspeople in Turkey
Argentine expatriate sportspeople in Belgium
Skra Bełchatów coaches
Fenerbahçe volleyball coaches
ZAKSA Kędzierzyn-Koźle coaches
AZS Olsztyn coaches